Marlis Spescha (born 20 April 1967) is a retired Swiss alpine skier who competed in the 1992 Winter Olympics.

References

1967 births
Living people
Swiss female alpine skiers
Olympic alpine skiers of Switzerland
Alpine skiers at the 1992 Winter Olympics
Place of birth missing (living people)
20th-century Swiss women